Alexander Flemming may refer to:

 Alexander Fleming (1881–1955), Scottish scientist
 Alexander Flemming (table tennis), table tennis player